Ligyromyia is a genus of flies in the family Stratiomyidae.

Distribution
Colombia.

Species
Ligyromyia columbiana Kertész, 1916

References

Stratiomyidae
Brachycera genera
Taxa named by Kálmán Kertész
Diptera of South America
Endemic fauna of Colombia